Omar Jagne (born 10 June 1992) is a Gambian footballer who plays as a forward for IFK Haninge in the Swedish Division 1, the domestic fifth tier.

References

External links
 
 
 Omar Jagne profile

1992 births
Living people
Association football forwards
Dalkurd FF players
Ljungskile SK players
Superettan players
Gambian footballers
The Gambia international footballers
Gambian expatriate footballers